Gordon Stewart Northcott (November 9, 1906 – October 2, 1930) was a Canadian serial killer, child rapist, and child abductor who was convicted of the murders of three young boys in California and confessed to the murders of nine in total.
Sentenced to death, he was executed on October 2, 1930.

Biography 
Gordon Stewart Northcott was born in Bladworth, Saskatchewan, and raised in British Columbia. He moved to Los Angeles with his parents in 1924.

Northcott asked his father to purchase a plot of land in Wineville, California. On this land, he built a chicken ranch and a house with the help of his father—who was in the construction business—and his nephew, Sanford Clark. It was under this pretext that Northcott brought Sanford from Bladworth to the United States.

Wineville Chicken Coop murders

While residing at his chicken ranch, Northcott abducted an undetermined number of boys and molested them. Typically, after molesting them, he would drive the victims home and let them go. Four of them, however, he murdered at the ranch.

Canadian police arrested Northcott and his mother on September 19, 1928. Due to errors in the extradition paperwork, they were not returned to Los Angeles until November 30. Northcott was implicated in the murder of Walter Collins, but because Northcott's mother had confessed to murdering Collins and had been sentenced for it, the state chose not to prosecute Northcott in that murder.

It was speculated that Northcott may have killed as many as 20 boys, but the state of California could not produce evidence to support that speculation. Ultimately, the state only brought an indictment against Northcott for the murders of an unidentified underage Mexican national later to be identified as Alvin Gothea—known as the "Headless Mexican"—and the brothers Lewis and Nelson Winslow (aged 12 and 10, respectively). The brothers had been reported missing from Pomona on May 16, 1928.

In early 1929, Northcott's trial was held before Judge George R. Freeman in Riverside County, California. The jury heard that he kidnapped, molested, tortured, and murdered the Winslow brothers and the "Headless Mexican" in 1928. On February 8, the 27-day trial ended with Northcott being convicted of those murders. On February 13, Freeman sentenced him to death. He was hanged on October 2, 1930, at San Quentin State Prison.

Popular culture
Clint Eastwood directed Changeling in 2008, and Gordon Northcott was portrayed by Jason Butler Harner.

American Horror Story referenced Northcott in season 5, Hotel. Maid Hazel Evers’s (Mare Winningham) son is abducted and killed upon the farm.

See also 
 List of serial killers in the United States

References 

1906 births
1930 deaths
1926 murders in the United States
1927 murders in the United States
1928 murders in the United States
20th-century Canadian criminals
20th-century executions by California
Canadian male criminals
Canadian murderers of children
Canadian people convicted of child sexual abuse
Canadian people convicted of murder
Canadian people executed abroad
Canadian rapists
Criminals from Los Angeles
Executed Canadian serial killers
Gay men
Male serial killers
Murder in Riverside County, California
People convicted of murder by California
People executed by California by hanging
People from Saskatchewan
San Quentin State Prison inmates
Violence against men in North America